IOFC or IofC may refer to:

 Initiatives of Change, international goodwill organization, and its related entities.
 International Offshore Financial Centre